Linton Commercial Historic District is a national historic district located at Linton, Greene County, Indiana. It encompasses 66 contributing buildings in the central business district of Linton. It developed between about 1870 and 1950, and includes notable examples of Italianate and Romanesque Revival style architecture. Notable buildings include the Linton Masonic Hall (c. 1900), I.O.O.F. Building (1892), Fourth Vein Coal Company Department Story (c. 1890), Telephone Exchange Building (1910), Linton Post Office (1934), Cine Theater (1938), and Linton City Hall (1913).

It was listed on the National Register of Historic Places in 2007.

References

Historic districts on the National Register of Historic Places in Indiana
Romanesque Revival architecture in Indiana
Italianate architecture in Indiana
Historic districts in Greene County, Indiana
National Register of Historic Places in Greene County, Indiana